Thurnia is a group of herbaceous plants described as a genus in 1883.

Thurnia is native to northern South America.

 Species
 Thurnia jenmanii Hook.f. - Guyana
 Thurnia polycephala Schnee - SE Colombia, S Venezuela, N Brazil
 Thurnia sphaerocephala (Rudge) Hook.f. - Guyana, Suriname, French Guiana, Colombia, S Venezuela, N Brazil

References

Poales genera
Thurniaceae